Edward Green Bradford (July 17, 1819 – January 16, 1884) was a Delaware politician and United States district judge of the United States District Court for the District of Delaware.

Education and career

Born in Cecil County, Maryland, Bradford graduated from Delaware College (now the University of Delaware) in 1839 and read law to enter the bar in 1842. He was a deputy state attorney general in Dover, Delaware from 1842 to 1850, and a city solicitor for Wilmington, Delaware. In 1849, he was elected to the Delaware House of Representatives, returning to private practice in Wilmington the following year. In 1861, he was named United States Attorney for the District of Delaware, a post that he held until 1866.

Federal judicial service

Bradford was nominated by President Ulysses S. Grant on December 11, 1871, to a seat on the United States District Court for the District of Delaware vacated by Judge Willard Hall. The following day, Bradford was confirmed by the United States Senate and received his commission. He served on the court until his death on January 16, 1884, in Wilmington.

Family

Bradford married Mary Alicia Heyward (1820-1848), the granddaughter of Thomas Heyward Jr., a signer of the Declaration of Independence for South Carolina. Their son, Edward Green Bradford II, also became both a Delaware State Representative and federal judge. Their daughter, Elizabeth Canby Bradford, married Alexis Irénée du Pont Jr.

References

Sources
 

1819 births
1884 deaths
Members of the Delaware House of Representatives
United States Attorneys for the District of Delaware
Judges of the United States District Court for the District of Delaware
United States federal judges appointed by Ulysses S. Grant
19th-century American judges
People from Cecil County, Maryland
United States federal judges admitted to the practice of law by reading law
19th-century American politicians